Noah is a Canadian short drama film, released in 2013. Written and directed by Walter Woodman and Patrick Cederberg as a class project when they were film students at Ryerson University, the film tells the story of Noah's (Sam Kantor) breakup with his girlfriend Amy (Caitlin McConkie-Pirie) entirely through Noah's use of computer applications such as Facebook, Skype, YouTube, Chatroulette and iTunes.

The film premiered at the 2013 Toronto International Film Festival, where it won the award for Best Canadian Short Film. It subsequently won the Canadian Screen Award for Best Live Action Short Drama at the 2nd Canadian Screen Awards.

The film was also one of the inspirations for the Modern Family episode "Connection Lost".

Woodman, Cederberg and Matthew Hornick, the film's coproducer, were subsequently active as the indie pop band Shy Kids, who received a Prism Prize nomination in 2016 for the animated music video for their single "Rockets".

See also 
 Computer screen film

References

External links 
 

2013 films
Best Live Action Short Drama Genie and Canadian Screen Award winners
Canadian student films
English-language Canadian films
2010s English-language films
Canadian drama short films
2010s Canadian films
Films about social media
Screenlife films